Mathilde Cini (born 18 November 1994) is a French swimmer.

She competed at the 2015 World Aquatics Championships and at the 2016 Summer Olympics in Rio de Janeiro.

References

 

1994 births
Living people
French female backstroke swimmers
Olympic swimmers of France
Swimmers at the 2016 Summer Olympics
Swimmers at the 2010 Summer Youth Olympics
People from Briançon
Sportspeople from Hautes-Alpes
Mediterranean Games gold medalists for France
Mediterranean Games medalists in swimming
Swimmers at the 2013 Mediterranean Games
Youth Olympic gold medalists for France
French female freestyle swimmers
20th-century French women
21st-century French women